To What Red Hell is a 1929 British crime film directed by Edwin Greenwood and starring Sybil Thorndike, Bramwell Fletcher and Janice Adair. Made at Twickenham Studios, it was one of the earliest all-talking sound films to be produced in Britain.

It was released in the United States by Tiffany Pictures.

Cast
 Sybil Thorndike as Mrs. Fairfield 
 John Hamilton  as Harold Fairfield 
 Bramwell Fletcher as Jim Nolan 
 Jillian Sand as Eleanor Dunham 
 Janice Adair as Madge Barton 
 Arthur Pusey as George Hope 
 Athole Stewart as Mr. Fairfield 
 Drusilla Wills as Mrs. Ellis 
 Wyn Weaver as Dr. Barton 
 Matthew Boulton as Inspector Jackson  
 Sara Allgood

References

Bibliography
 Low, Rachael. History of the British Film, 1918–1929. George Allen & Unwin, 1971.
 Wood, Linda. British Films, 1927-1939. British Film Institute, 1986.

External links

1929 films
British crime films
Films directed by Edwin Greenwood
1929 crime films
Films shot at Twickenham Film Studios
British black-and-white films
1920s English-language films
1920s British films